Wings of Change is an Austrian aircraft manufacturer based in Fulpmes, founded by Markus Gründhammer. The company specializes in the design and manufacture of paragliders in the form of ready-to-fly aircraft.

By 2003 the company had a range of gliders in their line including the Chinhook Bi two-place tandem, the  intermediate Taifun and Twister, plus the performance Tsunami.

Reviewer Noel Bertrand said of the company in a 2003 profile, "Markus Gründhammer still manages to make the safest paragliders without losing anything in performance."

The company's 2011 and later line includes gliders with such names as the Deathblade, Predator and Psychohammer.

Some guys need a Ferrari. As for me, I build my own paragliders in order to advance as a test pilot and also on a personal scale. To me, the motivation of finding ever new dimensions and testing out the limits of feasibility means developing mental strength and feeling 'pure life'."

The company also builds the Skyman line of lightweight mountain gliders for activities such as bivouac flying.

Aircraft 
Summary of aircraft built by Wings of Change:
Wings of Change Acrominator
Wings of Change Braveheart
Wings of Change Chinhook Bi
Wings of Change Crossblade
Wings of Change Deathblade
Wings of Change Druid
Wings of Change Edonis
Wings of Change Reinhold
Wings of Change Ötzi
Wings of Change Predator
Wings of Change Psychohammer
Wings of Change Speedy Gonzales
Wings of Change Taifun
Wings of Change Tsunami
Wings of Change Tuareg
Wings of Change Twister
Wings of Change X-Fighter
Wings of Change XPlor-air
Skyman Amicus
Skyman The Rock
Skyman CrossCountry
Skyman Heartbeat
Skyman CrossAlps
Skyman PassengAir
Skyman Tandem
Skyman Reinhold II
Skyman Furio

References

External links

Aircraft manufacturers of Austria
Paragliders
Austrian brands